The Knights of Pythias Temple in Louisville, Kentucky, also known as Chestnut Street Branch-Y.M.C.A., was built in 1914–15.  It was designed by Henry Wolters.  It is a buff-colored brick building with limestone trim.

It was built as the state headquarters for the black Knights of Pythias organization in Kentucky.  By 1916, there were thirteen chapters of the black Knights of Pythias listed in Louisville, most meeting at this new Pythian Building.

It was listed on the National Register of Historic Places in 1978.

References

Cultural infrastructure completed in 1914
Knights of Pythias buildings
Local landmarks in Louisville, Kentucky
Louisville
Clubhouses on the National Register of Historic Places in Kentucky
National Register of Historic Places in Louisville, Kentucky
1914 establishments in Kentucky